Candy Augustine Agbane (born 22 December 1996 in Lagos, Nigeria) is a Nigerian professional footballer who plays as an winger for Bangladesh Premier League club Chittagong Abahani.

Club career

Ikorodu United
He began his career in the Ikorodu United F.C. in Nigeria Premier League.

Yenicami Ağdelen
In August 2016, Agbane joined Süper Lig club Yenicami Ağdelen on a two-year deal.

Lefke TSK (loan)
He joined Lefke TSK in September 2017.

After a successful loan spell, he joined the Northern Cyprus club on a permanent deal.

MŠK Tesla Stropkov
On 3 March 2019, Agbane signed for Slovakian 3. Liga side Stropkov at the start of the 2019–2020.

Lefke TSK 
After a season in Slovakia, he returned to Lefke TSK in January 2020.

Chittagong Abahani
After a very short spell at Mesarya SK, Candy signed for Bangladesh Premier League club Chittagong Abahani as mid-season signing in April, 2022. It was his first ever club from Asia. He scored 4 goals and provided 4 assists in 10 appearances for the club in first season. He scored once and assisted once in the last match of the season. In August 2022, Candy signed a contract extension with Ctg Abahani for 2022–23 season.

References

External links
 Futbalnet profile 
www.ktff.org/BilgiBankasi/FutbolcuDetayi/17191

1996 births
Living people
Nigerian footballers
Nigerian expatriate footballers
Expatriate footballers in Slovakia
Nigerian expatriate sportspeople in Slovakia
MŠK Tesla Stropkov players
Nigeria Professional Football League players
Association football forwards
Expatriate footballers in Northern Cyprus
Nigerian expatriate sportspeople in Northern Cyprus